The canton of Dreux-2 is an administrative division of the Eure-et-Loir department, northern France. It was created at the French canton reorganisation which came into effect in March 2015. Its seat is in Dreux.

It consists of the following communes:
 
Le Boullay-Mivoye
Le Boullay-Thierry
Bréchamps
Charpont
Chaudon
Croisilles
Dreux (partly)
Écluzelles
Luray
Mézières-en-Drouais
Ormoy
Ouerre
Sainte-Gemme-Moronval
Villemeux-sur-Eure

References

Cantons of Eure-et-Loir